Harpal Singh (born 1981) is an English footballer.

Harpal Singh may also refer to:

 Harpal Singh (field hockey) (born 1983), Indian Olympic field hockey player
 Harpal Singh Panwar (born 1945), Indian politician from Indian National Congress
 Harpal Singh Sathi (born 1942), Indian politician from Bharatiya Janata Party
 Harpal Singh Sokhi, Indian chef